Emma Stina Blackstenius (born 5 February 1996) is a Swedish professional footballer who plays as a forward for Arsenal of the English Women's Super League and the Sweden national team.

Club career

Vadstena
Blackstenius grew up in Vadstena and joined local club Vadstena GIF in 2002 at the age of 6. On 20 April 2011, Blackstenius made her senior debut for the club against BK Kenty in the Östergötland region Division 3, the fifth tier of women's football in Sweden. She started the match and scored twice as Vadstena lost 5–4. In her debut season, Blackstenius started all 18 leagues games and scored 21 goals. She played 16 games the following season and finished as the league's top scorer with 38 goals. She was named 2012 Östergötland player of the year.

Linköping
Prior to the start of the 2013 season, Blackstenius signed a three-year contract with Linköpings FC of the top-flight Damallsvenskan. She made her Damallsvenskan debut as a 68th-minute substitute on 17 April 2013 in a 1–1 draw with Kopparbergs/Göteborg FC. She scored her first top-flight goal on 28 May 2013, in a 3–1 victory over Malmö FF. On 31 July 2013, Blackstenius played her first Svenska Cupen match for the club, scoring a hattrick during a 13–0 win against Landsbro IF. Having appeared in 9 of the first 11 league games of the season all as a substitute, Blackstenius was given a bigger role towards the end of the season. She started all of the 11 remaining league games and went on a run of scoring six goals in the final five games as Linköping finished third. Linköping reached the 2013–14 Swedish Cup final. They beat Kristianstads DFF 2–1 with Blackstenius appearing as a 62nd-minute substitute. In October 2014, Blackstenius made her UEFA Women's Champions League debut away to English FA Women's Super League side Liverpool. Linköping lost the first leg 2–1 but won 3–0 at home to progress. At the  awards, Blackstenius was named Breakthrough Player of the Year. In 2016, Linköping won the 2016 Damallsvenskan title. Blackstenius was the second-highest scorer in the league with 19 goals behind teammate Pernille Harder.

Montpellier
In January 2017, Blackstenius signed two-and-a-half-year deal with French Division 1 Féminine club Montpellier HSC. She made her debut on 4 January 2017, entering as a halftime substitute against Paris Saint-Germain and scored the 81st-minute winner in the 2–1 victory. On 19 February 2017, she scored four goals in a Coupe de France 16–0 win over fourth division side FC Domont. Joining halfway through the 2016–17 season, Blackstenius helped Montpellier to finish second in the league behind Olympique Lyon, scoring seven goals in 11 league games. The following season, Blackstenius finished as the fourth-highest scorer in the league with 12 goals in 20 games as Montpellier finished third. Blackstenius fell out of favour at the start of the 2018–19 season, only starting in six of 12 appearances and opted to leave in January 2019.

Return to Linköping
On 30 January 2019, Blackstenius returned to Sweden, signing a two-year contract with her former club Linköpings FC. She made her second debut in a 5–0 win over Växjö DFF in the Damallsvenskan. The team finished fifth with Blackstenius scoring nine goals.

BK Häcken
Ahead of the 2020 season, Blackstenius moved to Kopparbergs/Göteborg FC (later rebranded BK Häcken). A dispute between Linköping and Göteborg in regard to the transfer had to be settled by the Swedish Football Association's arbitration committee with neither party wishing to comment on the nature of the dispute. In her debut season with the club, Göteborg won the 2020 Damallsvenskan. On 4 April 2021, Blackstenius scored the only goal in a 2020–21 Svenska Cupen semi-final win over FC Rosengård before scoring again in the final as BK Häcken beat Eskilstuna United 3–0. In the 2021 season, Häcken finished second behind Rosengård. Blackstenius led the league in both goals (17) and assists (8). In November 2021, she was named to the 20-player Ballon d'Or shortlist. Blackstenius left the club upon the expiry of her contract at the end of the 2021 season.

Arsenal
On 14 January 2022, English FA Women's Super League club Arsenal confirmed the signing of Blackstenius on a free transfer. She made her debut five days later, as a 69th-minute substitute for Vivianne Miedema in a 1–0 defeat at home to Manchester United in the League Cup quarter-finals.

International career

Youth
On 30 October 2012, Blackstenius made her Sweden under-17 debut during 2013 UEFA Women's Under-17 Championship qualification, scoring a hattrick in a 9–0 win over Croatia. As an under-19 international, Blackstenius featured prominently at the 2015 UEFA Women's Under-19 Championship. She finished as tournament's top goalscorer after scoring six goals for the victorious Swedish team, including two in the 3–1 final win over Spain. In total she scored 50 goals in 49 appearances while representing Sweden at various youth age groups.

Senior

Blackstenius made her senior Sweden national team debut as a 79th-minute substitute in a 1–0 UEFA Women's Euro 2017 qualifying win over Denmark on 27 October 2015, at Gamla Ullevi. On 8 April 2016, she scored her first senior international goal on her fifth appearance, the third goal in Sweden's 3–0 win over Slovakia in Poprad during UEFA Women's Euro 2017 qualifying.

In June 2016, Blackstenius was named in the Sweden squad for the 2016 Summer Olympics. Having appeared as a substitute against South Africa in the opening group match, Blackstenius was an unused substitute for the next two as Sweden progressed as one of the two best-ranked third place teams. In the quarter-final against the reigning World Cup and Olympic champions United States, she came of the bench to replace the injured Fridolina Rolfö in the 18th minute and scored in the second half to give Sweden a lead. With the game tied at 1–1, Sweden progressed following a penalty shoot-out. Coming on again as a substitute in the Gold Medal match, Blackstenius scored in the 67th minute to pull Sweden within one score of Germany. The game finished 2–1 with Sweden winning the silver medal.

The following summer, Blackstenius was called up to the squad for Euro 2017. She scored in consecutive group games against Russia and Italy before Sweden were knocked out at the quarter-final stage by host nation Netherlands.

Having helped helping Sweden qualify for the 2019 FIFA Women's World Cup with three goals, second on the team behind Kosovare Asllani, Blackstenius was selected in the final squad to travel to France. She made her World Cup debut starting the first game, a 2–0 win over Chile. She scored her first World Cup goal in the round of 16, the only goal in a 1–0 win over Canada. She scored another game winniner in the following match, a 2–1 quarter-final win over Germany, Sweden's first win against Germany in a major tournament since the 1995 World Cup. They lost the semi-final to Netherlands before winning the third-place match against England.

In July 2021, Blackstenius was named to her second successive Olympics for the delayed 2020 Tokyo games. Sweden repeated their silver medal run with Blackstenius having her most successful tournament to date, leading the team in goals with five. She scored three goals during the group stage: a brace during a 3–0 win over the United States in the opening group game and another against Australia. In the knockout stage, she scored the go-ahead goal in a 3–1 quarter-final win over hosts Japan before again netting in an Olympic gold medal match, this time to give Sweden the lead over Canada. She was substituted in the 106th minute during extra-time with Canada eventually winning the gold medal on penalties 3–2 as four of Sweden's six penalty takers were unsuccessful. Combined with her goals at Rio 2016, Blackstenius' seven Olympic goals surpassed the previous Swedish record of six in the competition set by Lotta Schelin.

In June 2022, Blackstenius was named to the squad for Euro 2022. Despite injury concerns, she was fit enough to be named on the bench for the team's opening group stage game against Netherlands and appeared as a 68th-minute substitute in the 1–1 draw. She started all four remaining matches, scoring one goal during a 5–0 victory over Portugal, before Sweden were eliminated by hosts England at the semi-final stage 4–0.

Personal life
Blackstenius is the daughter of Magnus Blackstenius and Lena Wiberg. She has an older brother, Oscar, and her younger half-sister is Sweden international handball player Nina Koppang. Blackstenius also grew up playing handball and did so competitively until 2013. Blackstenius studied economics at Kungshögaskolan in Mjölby.

Career statistics

Club

International

Scores and results list Sweden's goal tally first, score column indicates score after each Blackstenius goal.

Honours
Linköping
Damallsvenskan: 2016
Svenska Cupen: 2013–14, 2014–15	

Kopparbergs/Göteborg FC
 Damallsvenskan: 2020
Svenska Cupen: 2020–21

Arsenal
FA Women's League Cup: 2022–23

Sweden U17
UEFA Women's Under-17 Championship runner-up: 2013

Sweden U19
UEFA Women's Under-19 Championship: 2015

Sweden
Summer Olympics silver medal: 2016, 2020
Algarve Cup: 2018
FIFA Women's World Cup third place: 2019

Individual
Division 3 Golden Boot: 2012
SvFF Breakthrough Player of the Year: 2015
UEFA Women's Under-19 Championship Golden Boot: 2015
Damallsvenskan Golden Boot: 2021

References

External links

Profile at Linköpings FC 

1996 births
Living people
People from Vadstena Municipality
Women's association football forwards
Swedish women's footballers
Linköpings FC players
Montpellier HSC (women) players
BK Häcken FF players
Arsenal W.F.C. players
Sweden women's international footballers
Expatriate women's footballers in France
Swedish expatriates in France
Expatriate women's footballers in England
Swedish expatriates in England
Damallsvenskan players
Division 1 Féminine players
Women's Super League players
2019 FIFA Women's World Cup players
Footballers at the 2016 Summer Olympics
Medalists at the 2016 Summer Olympics
Footballers at the 2020 Summer Olympics
Medalists at the 2020 Summer Olympics
Olympic medalists in football
Olympic footballers of Sweden
Olympic silver medalists for Sweden
Footballers from Östergötland County
UEFA Women's Euro 2022 players
UEFA Women's Euro 2017 players